The 2013 FIBA Asia Under-16 Championship qualification was held in late 2012 and early 2013 with the Gulf region, West Asia, Southeast Asia, East Asia, Central Asia and South Asia each conducting tournaments.

Qualification format
The following are eligible to participate:

 The organizing country.
 The champion team from the previous FIBA Asia Under-16 Championship.
 The four best-placed teams from the previous FIBA Asia Under-16 Championship will qualify the same number of teams from their respective sub-zones.
 The two best teams from the sub-zones.

2011 FIBA Asia Under-16 Championship

Qualified teams

* Withdrew.

** Only 3 teams registered from West Asia.

Central Asia
The 2013 CABA Under-16 Championship was held at Shchuchinsk, Kazakhstan from June 26, 2013 . The winner teams qualifies for 2013 FIBA Asia Under-16 Championship.

East Asia
All the others withdrew, so ,,, qualified automatically.

South Asia
The 2013 SABA Under-16 Championship was held at Dakar, Bangladesh from July 3 to 5, 2013. The winner teams qualifies for 2013 FIBA Asia Under-16 Championship.

Southeast Asia

The 2nd SEABA Under-16 Championship was held at Yogyakarta, Indonesia from July 14 to 18, 2013.The two best teams qualifies for 2013 FIBA Asia Under-16 Championship.

West Asia
The 2012 West Asian Under-15 Championship was held at Amman, Jordan from September 26 to 28, 2013. The three best teams excluding Iran qualifies for 2013 FIBA Asia Under-16 Championship.

References

FIBA Asia Under-16 Championship